The following roads have been numbered 99W:

United States
 U.S. Route 99W (central California), Manteca to Stockton
 U.S. Route 99W (northern California), Sacramento to Red Bluff
 U.S. Route 99W (Oregon)
 Oregon Route 99W

See also
List of highways numbered 99E